Keeri is a lake of Estonia, Tartu County.

See also
List of lakes of Estonia

Keeri
Elva Parish
Lakes of Tartu County